The 2014–15 Eastern Washington Eagles women's basketball team will represent Eastern Washington University during the 2014–15 NCAA Division I women's basketball season. The Eagles, are led by fourteenth year head coach Wendy Schuller and play their home games at Reese Court. They were members of the Big Sky Conference. They finished the season 21–12, 12–6 in Big Sky to finish in a tie for third place. They advanced to the semifinals to the Big Sky women's tournament where they lost to Montana. They were invited to the Women's National Invitation Tournament where they defeated Washington State in the first round before losing in the second round to a fellow Big Sky member Sacramento State.

Roster

Schedule
 

|-
!colspan=8 style="background:#a10022; color:#FFFFFF;"| Exhibition

|-
!colspan=8 style="background:#a10022; color:#FFFFFF;"| Regular Season

|-
!colspan=9 style="background:#a10022; color:#FFFFFF;"| Big Sky Women's Tournament

|-
!colspan=9 style="background:#a10022; color:#FFFFFF;"| WNIT

See also
 2014–15 Eastern Washington Eagles men's basketball team

References

Eastern Washington Eagles women's basketball seasons
Eastern Washington
2015 Women's National Invitation Tournament participants
Eastern Washington Eagles
Eastern Washington Eagles